Line Bareiro (born 1950) is a Paraguayan political scientist, civil rights activist and feminist.

Life
Line Bareiro studied at the University of Heidelberg in Germany, gaining a Masters in political science in 1979 and working as a research assistant to Dieter Nohlen. Returning to Paraguay she worked with the NGO Paraguayo de Datos (BPD) until its suppression by Alfredo Stroessner in 1982. She was a founder member of the Centro de Documentación e Estudios in 1985, and active in the women's movement Coordinación de Mujeres del Paraguay (CMP), founded in 1987. After Stroessner's overthrow in 1989, she was a founder member of Decidamos, a citizen advocacy group of NGOs.

In 2010 Bareiro was elected to the UN's Committee on the Elimination of Discrimination against Women (CEDAW), to serve on the committee from 2011 until 2014.

Works
 (ed. with Clyde Soto & Mary Monte) Alquimistas: documentos para otra historia de las mujeres, 1993
 (ed. with Ticio Escobar & Saúl Sosnowski) Hacia una cultura para la democracia en el Paraguay, 1994
 (ed. with Celsa Vega) Campesinas frente a la pobreza : condiciones de vida de las familias organizadas de la Cordillera, 1994
 (ed. with Clyde Soto) Ciudadanas: una memoria inconstante, 1997
 (ed.) El costo de la libertad : asesinato y heridas en el marzo paraguayo, 1999
 (with Clyde Soto) Women. In Peter Lambert & Andrew Nickson, The Transition to Democracy in Paraguay, Springer, pp. 87–.

References

1950 births
Living people
Paraguayan women's rights activists
Paraguayan human rights activists
Women human rights activists
Paraguayan feminists
Paraguayan political scientists
Women political scientists
Heidelberg University alumni
Place of birth missing (living people)
Organization founders
Paraguayan officials of the United Nations
Paraguayan expatriates in Germany